Equestrian at the 2011 Southeast Asian Games was held at Arthayasa Stables and Country Club, Depok, Indonesia.

Medal summary

Medal table

External links
  2011 Southeast Asian Games

2011 Southeast Asian Games events
2011
Southeast Asian Games
Equestrian sports competitions in Indonesia